Dan Loney (born December 7, 1977) is a former American football offensive lineman who last played for the San Jose SaberCats of the Arena Football League. Loney attended Atascadero High School in Atascadero, California, where he played competitive football; he continued to play football at Cal Poly. Upon graduating, he was not selected in the 2000 NFL Draft; as such, he signed with the San Jose SaberCats in early 2001.

Loney spent one year on the SaberCats' practice squad. In 2002, he was promoted to the team's active roster; from 2002 to 2008, he was used primarily as an offensive lineman (though he did see limited action as a defensive lineman). During his time with the SaberCats, Loney appeared in four ArenaBowls (XVI, XVIII, XXI, and XXII); the SaberCats won the first three contests, giving Loney three AFL championships in six years. Following the SaberCats' loss to the Philadelphia Soul in ArenaBowl XXII, the league suspended operations; this ended Loney's first stint with the SaberCats.

After one year, the Arena Football League resumed operations in 2010. The SaberCats, however, did not rejoin the league; as such, Loney spent the season with the Oklahoma City Yard Dawgz. In 2011, the SaberCats finally rejoined the league; Loney rejoined the team for what was to be his final AFL season. He retired following the SaberCats' campaign.

References

American football offensive linemen
Players of American football from California
1977 births
Living people
Cal Poly Mustangs football players
San Jose SaberCats players
Oklahoma City Yard Dawgz players
People from Atascadero, California
Sportspeople from Southern California